Johnny Depp trial may refer to:

 Depp v News Group Newspapers Ltd, decided 2020
 Depp v. Heard, decided 2022